Tomasz Arceusz (born 11 September 1959 in Poland) is a Polish retired footballer.

References

Polish footballers
Living people
1959 births
Association football forwards
People from Płońsk County
Motor Lublin players
Legia Warsaw players
Vaasan Palloseura players